The 2020–21 Women's Belgian Hockey League was the 95th season of the Women's Belgian Hockey League, the top women's Belgian field hockey league.

The season started on 10 September 2020 and concluded on 9 May 2021 with the second match of the championship final. Gantoise won the title for the third time.

Changes from 2019–20
For the first time in history, the league was played with 14 teams instead of 12. Teams played each other once in a single round-robin format, with the top eight teams qualifying for the play–offs and the bottom six progressing to the relegation series.

Teams

Number of teams by provinces

Regular season

Standings

Results

Play–downs
The points obtained during the regular season were halved before the start of the play-downs. As a result, the teams started with the following points before the play-downs: Waterloo Ducks 9 points, Léopold 7.5, White Star 5, Mechelse 4, Wellington 3 and Leuven 1.5.

Play–offs
The points obtained during the regular season were halved before the start of the play-downs. As a result, the teams started with the following points before the play-offs: Gantoise 18.5 points, Daring 14, Dragons 13, Braxgata 12, Antwerp 11, Racing 11, Herakles 10.5 and Victory 10.5.

Pool A

Pool B

Classification matches

Fifth to eighth place classification

Seventh and eighth place

Fifth and sixth place

First to fourth place classification

Semi-finals

Gantoise won the series 2–0.

Dragons won the series 2–0.

Third and fourth place

Final

Gantoise won the series 2–0, winning the title.

Top Goalscorers

References

Belgian Hockey League seasons
Women's sport in Belgium